Betty Daussmond (1873–1957), born Marguerite Anne Bettina Doneau, was a French stage and film actress.

In 1914 she played the leading female part in Georges Feydeau's last full-length farce, Je ne trompe pas mon mari!. The author commented that she brought "joie de vivre" to the role on "her pretty Columbine lips".

Selected filmography
 All for Love (1933)
 A Weak Woman (1933)
 Poliche (1934)
 Three Sailors (1934)
 The New Testament (1936)
 Woman of Malacca (1937)
 Cocoanut (1939)
 White Paws (1949)
 Three Women (1952)

References

Bibliography
 

  Wearing, J. P. The London Stage 1920-1929: A Calendar of Productions, Performers, and Personnel. Rowman & Littlefield, 2014.

External links

Michel Bouquet and Betty Daussmond in "L'Invitation au Chateau". Paris, theater of Atelier, November 1947; photograph at Getty Images.

1873 births
1957 deaths
French film actresses
French stage actresses
People from Sarthe